Phephana (alternately Fefana) is a village in Hanumangarh district of Rajasthan state in India. This is the largest village of Nohar tehsil.

References

External links 

Villages in Hanumangarh district